SS Tacito was an oil tanker that was built in England in 1924 and registered in Argentina. In 1963 she was renamed Astranorte.

Building
The Northumberland Shipbuilding Company built Tacito in Howdon on the north bank of the River Tyne in England, launching her on 28 October 1924 and completing her that December.

They supplied steam at 180 lbf/in2 to a triple expansion engine built by the Wallsend Slipway Co Ltd. Between them the engines developed a total of 626 NHP and propelled her by a single screw.

Career
Juvenal was built for the Compañia General de Combustibles, who owned her until 1959. In 1932 she was assigned the code letters HBDS. In 1934 these were superseded by the call sign LCGF.

On 28 July 1942 off the coast of British Guiana the  torpedoed the Brazilian cargo ship Barbacena. Tacito was one of three ships who rescued survivors.

On 24 July 1943 off the east coast of Brazil  torpedoed the cargo ship , a Canadian-built Fort ship chartered by the UK Ministry of War Transport. 53 of her crew survived in two lifeboats. Tacito picked them up at 0930 hrs on 29 July and landed them at Rio de Janeiro on 1 August.

In 1959 ownership of Juvenal passed to Trans-Orna srl. In 1963 it passed to Astramar Compañia Argentina de Naviera SAC, who renamed her Astranorte. On 1 August 1965 Astranorte arrived in Rosario to be scrapped.

References

See also
, a tanker built for Compañia General de Combustibles in 1928

1924 ships
Merchant ships of Argentina
Oil tankers
Ships built on the River Tyne
Steamships of Argentina
Tankers of Argentina